The Arafura Games is a multi-sport event where athletes with a disability and able-bodied athletes compete in the same program. It's held every two years in the Australian city of Darwin, Northern Territory. The Arafura Games takes its name from the Arafura Sea, which lies between northern Australia and Southeast Asia.

Results

References

 PNG Netball Results & Tournaments since 1991. Has 2007 & 2001 results. Papua New Guinea netball webpage
 Pepes win Gold at Arafura 2007. Papua New Guinea Netball webpage
 2007 Official Results. TG Sports webpage

External links
 Official Webpage

 
International netball competitions hosted by Australia
netball
Netball in the Northern Territory
Netball at multi-sport events